Willy Hess (12 October 1906 – 9 May 1997) was a Swiss musicologist, composer, and famous Beethoven scholar. He achieved fame after compiling and publishing a  catalogue of works of Beethoven that were not listed in the "complete" edition. He orchestrated the Piano Concerto No. 0, in E-flat from a piano score.

Life
Hess was born in Winterthur, where he attended primary and high school, and later studied at the Zurich Conservatory (merged in 1999 into the School of Music, Drama, and Dance (HMT), itself merged in 2007 into the Zurich University of the Arts (ZHdK)) and at the University. He also taught piano, counterpoint, composition, and wrote about music.

Among other works, he wrote "3 Ländler, Op. 28 for 4-hand piano duet. He also wrote a Sonata for Viola and Bassoon, the only classical-style chamber work written for that combination of instruments.

He also was a bassoonist with the Winterthur Stadtorchester from 1942 to 1971.

He died in Winterthur.

Bibliography
 James F. Green: The New Hess Catalog of Beethoven's Works'' (Vance Brook Publishing, 2003),

See also
 Vestas Feuer — A Beethoven operatic fragment first completed and published by Hess.
 List of compositions by Ludwig van Beethoven

References 

1906 births
1997 deaths
20th-century Swiss historians
20th-century Swiss composers
20th-century musicologists
Beethoven scholars
People from Winterthur
Swiss classical bassoonists
Swiss classical composers
Swiss musicologists
Zurich University of the Arts alumni